Kevin Callan is a Canadian canoe enthusiast, media personality, and author of thirteen books, including the bestselling   The Happy Camper and "A Paddler's Guide To" series.

Biography
For more than 25 years, Callan has spoken and given key note presentations at major canoe and wilderness events across North America.

Callan is also a frequent guest on Canadian radio and television, field editor for Explore, and regular contributor to Canadian Geographic, ON Nature, Kanawa and Canoeroots Magazine. He is a winner of three Canadian National Magazine Awards and four film awards, including "best of" in the prestigious Waterwalker Film festival 

Since 1995, Callan has lived in Peterborough, Ontario, where he teaches Environmental Issues and Sciences at Sir Sandford Fleming College  .

Bibliography
Brook Trout and Black Flies:  A Paddler’s Guide to Algonquin Park (1997)
Gone Canoeing:  Wilderness Weekends in Southern Ontario (2001)
A Paddler’s Guide to Ontario (2003)
A Paddler’s Guide to Algonquin Park (2004)
A Paddler’s Guide to Ontario’s Lost Canoe Routes (2004)
A Paddler’s Guide to Weekend Wilderness Adventures in Southern Ontario (2004)
A Paddler’s Guide to Killarney and the French River (2006)
A Paddler’s Guide to Quetico and Beyond (2007)
Wilderness Pleasures:  A Practical Guide to Camping Bliss (2008)
The Happy Camper:  An Essential Guide to Life Outdoors (2012)
Dazed but Not Confused: Tales of a Wilderness Wanderer (2013)

References

Canadian non-fiction writers
Living people
Canadian male canoeists
Year of birth missing (living people)